Żarki  is a town in Myszków County, Silesian Voivodeship, Poland, with 4,556 inhabitants (2019). The history of Żarki dates back to the early 14th century, as the village was first mentioned in documents from the 1320s. For centuries, Żarki belonged to Lelow County, Kraków Voivodeship, historic province of Lesser Poland.

History
It is not known when the village of Żarki received town charter: it happened before 1382, most likely during the reign of King Casimir III the Great. By 1406, Żarki already was a well established private town, governed by a vogt. Żarki belonged to several noble families, and was a local centre of craft and trade. In 1556, fairs were established on every Tuesday. Żarki had a market square, and its population in 1662 reached 620 residents. In 1664, the town burned in a great fire.

In 1720, Żarki was moved to a new location. At that time, the town became a center of iron ore mining, with a blast furnace. By 1791, its population grew to over 1200, and in 1793, the town was annexed by the Kingdom of Prussia (see Partitions of Poland). In 1807, Żarki became part of the Duchy of Warsaw, and in 1815, Russian-controlled Congress Poland, in which it remained until World War I. Due to efforts of Piotr Steinkeller, Żarki was an industrial center, where agricultural machinery was manufactured. In the 1850s, a cotton plant was opened here as well. Following the January Uprising, Żarki lost its town charter.

In 1914, the population of Żarki was app. 5000. During the month of October 1918, a short-lived local post was organized by the officer in charge of Civil Affairs of the District of Dabrow.

In the Second Polish Republic, Żarki belonged to Zawiercie County of Kielce Voivodeship. On September 4, 1939, Żarki was burned to the ground by the Wehrmacht.  They shot more than 100 residents, most of whom were Jewish.    Other Jews were robbed and many were conscripted for forced labor.  Later, in late 1941 or early 1942, Jews, including those who had been deported to Zarki, were forced into an overcrowded ghetto without much access to food and medical care.  Some young Jews were able to establish a small farm which provided vegetables, fruits, and fish to the Jewish residents. In October 1942, the Germans ordered Polish farmers to bring horses and wagons to the ghetto.  Around 800 Jews were rounded up by the German SS, Ukrainian auxiliaries, and Polish police.  Those in hiding who were caught were shot.  The Polish farmers took the Jews to the train station in Zloty Potok and from there they were taken in freight cars to Treblinka where they were immediately murdered.  About 1600 other Jews had fled when they heard the news that the Polish farmers had been ordered to come to the ghetto.  Most fled to other ghettos and most eventually were murdered in killing camps.  The number of Żarki Jews who survived the war and Holocaust is unknown.

In 1949, Żarki regained its town charter.

Demographics

Historic sites
Among local points of interest there are: 
 Przewodziszowice Castle
 sanctuary of Mary, Patron Saint of Families, 
 St. Simon and St. Jude church, built in 1522, and remodelled in the 17th century, 
 wooden church of St. Barbara (17th century), 
 ruins of an 18th-century manor house, with walls and tower, 
 ruins of St. Stanislaus church (1782),

References

External links 
 Leśniów Sanctuary devoted to the cult of the virgin mary.
 Jewish Community in Żarki on Virtual Shtetl
 Yizkor Book on the Jewish Community of Żarki

Cities and towns in Silesian Voivodeship
Myszków County
Kraków Voivodeship (14th century – 1795)
Piotrków Governorate
Kielce Voivodeship (1919–1939)
Nazi war crimes in Poland